John Charles Lodge (born 20 July 1945) is an English musician, best known as bass guitarist, vocalist, and songwriter of the longstanding rock band the Moody Blues. He has also worked as a record producer and has collaborated with other musicians outside the band. In 2018, Lodge was inducted into the Rock and Roll Hall of Fame as a member of the Moody Blues.

Biography

Early years
John Charles Lodge was born in Erdington, Birmingham on 20 July 1945. He attended school at Birches Green Junior School, Central Grammar School and later went to college at the Birmingham College of Advanced Technology for engineering. His early influences were musicians like Buddy Holly and Jerry Lee Lewis. By age 14, Lodge had met future bandmate Ray Thomas.

Career
Lodge was initially involved in the Birmingham music scene, although he temporarily dropped out to continue his studies. In 1966, however, after the Moody Blues' original bassist Clint Warwick had left the band, Lodge succeeded the temporary substitute bassist Rod Clarke as the permanent bassist and vocalist, rejoining Ray Thomas during the same period as the band recruited guitarist/vocalist Justin Hayward to replace Denny Laine. Lodge's distinctive falsetto ranged from a high harmonious voice and his solid lead vocals were a major asset to the revised Moody Blues from this point on.

Lodge's prolific songwriting for the Moody Blues has created such songs as  "Peak Hour", "(Evening) Time to Get Away", "Gimme a Little Somethin'", "Ride My See-Saw", "House of Four Doors", "Eyes of a Child", "Send Me No Wine", "To Share Our Love", "Candle of Life", "Tortoise and the Hare", "Minstrel's Song", "Emily's Song", "Isn't Life Strange" (which earned Lodge an ASCAP songwriting award), "I'm Just a Singer" (which also won him an ASCAP songwriting award), "Steppin' in a Slide Zone","Survival",  "Talking Out of Turn",  "Nervous",  "Sitting at the Wheel","Hole in the World", "Under My Feet", "It May Be a Fire", "Rock 'n' Roll Over You", "Love is on the Run", "Here Comes the Weekend", "Lean on Me (Tonight)", "Shadows on the Wall", "Magic","Wherever You Are", "Love Don't Come Easy", "Words You Say", "Forever Now", "On This Christmas Day","The Spirit of Christmas", and "Gemini Dream" — the latter being a co-composition with Justin Hayward that won them jointly an ASCAP songwriting award. Bass Player magazine noted that Lodge was voted as one of the top ten bass players of all time.

Lodge co-wrote "Out and In" with Mike Pinder, recorded on To Our Children's Children's Children in 1969. He also collaborated with fellow Moody Blues member Justin Hayward on the 1975 album Blue Jays released on Threshold Records, which in addition to Hayward's compositions included three songs written by Lodge;  "Maybe", "Saved by the Music" and "You", together with two tracks co-written by Lodge & Hayward; "Remember Me (My Friend)" and "When You Wake Up", and later, Lodge released a solo album, Natural Avenue, on Decca in 1977, from which the single, "Say You Love Me" was issued. During the 1970s, he produced music for the band Trapeze.

In 1980, Lodge released a non-album solo single "Street Cafe" b/w "Threw It All Away" on Decca. This single featured Moody Blues keyboardist Patrick Moraz, who had joined the group two years earlier, replacing Pinder.  Since 1981, Lodge has co-written songs for the band with Justin Hayward, such as: "Meet Me Halfway", "Talkin' Talkin'", "Running Out of Love", "Slings and Arrows", "Want to Be with You", "River of Endless Love", "Breaking Point", "Miracle", "Once Is Enough", "Highway", "Is This Heaven?", "Sooner or Later (Walking on Air)", "Strange Times", and "The One", and from December, "In the Quiet of Christmas Morning (Bach 147)" amongst others.

In 1985, the Moody Blues picked up the Ivor Novello Award for Outstanding Contribution to Music.

Lodge participated in the 2011 bluegrass tribute album to the Moody Blues, Moody Bluegrass TWO...Much Love, as lead vocal his song "Send Me No Wine". Lodge joined other current and past members of the Moody Blues on this album.  Two of Lodge's Moody Blues compositions, "Ride My See-Saw" and "I'm Just a Singer (In a Rock and Roll Band)" are featured on an earlier tribute album, Moody Bluegrass: A Nashville Tribute to the Moody Blues, released in 2004.

In May 2015 John released a solo album titled 10,000 Light Years Ago, which reunited him with Ray Thomas and Mike Pinder. He toured behind the album in 2017 & 2018. 

In February 2019, Lodge took his solo band onto the ‘Cruise to the Edge’ sailing out of Florida.  Lodge and Jon Davison of Yes became friends on board when Davison began dating his daughter Emily.  Davison has since toured with John as ‘guest vocalist’ 

On 2 April 2019, it was announced that Lodge would join Yes on "The Royal Affair Tour" in the summer of 2019 which will also include Asia and Carl Palmer's ELP Legacy. 

In September 2019, Lodge was given the 'Lifetime Achievement Award' at the Annual Prog Awards by Prog (magazine) in London.

In February 2020, Lodge appeared on ‘Rock and Romance Cruise’ alongside Don Felder, America, and other acts, before continuing on a 12 date tour. Jon Davison again joined Lodge on stage.  The tour ended on March 8, just before the COVID-19 lockdowns began.

During lockdown Lodge wrote and recorded in his home studio the song ‘In These Crazy Times’.  Lodge recorded the track himself, and was joined by his son, Kristian, on lead guitar, his wife, Kirsten, on backing vocals, and Jon Davison also provided backing vocals, whilst his daughter, Emily, managed the project.

Personal life
Lodge has been married to his wife, Kirsten, since 10 September 1968, and they are the parents of two grown children. Their first child, a daughter named Emily, was born in 1970; Lodge wrote "Emily's Song" for the 1971 Moody Blues album, Every Good Boy Deserves Favour. His son Kristian was born two years later. Lodge has spoken on several occasions about being an Evangelical Christian, and credits his faith with preventing him from sinking into the more dangerous elements of the rock music business. Lodge is a supporter of Birmingham City F.C.

He resides in Surrey.

Solo discography

Studio albums
Blue Jays (1975) with Justin Hayward UK No. 4
Natural Avenue (1977)
10,000 Light Years Ago (2015)

Live albums
Live from Birmingham: The 10,000 Light Years Tour (2017)
The Royal Affair and After (2021)

Compilation albums
B Yond - The Very Best of

References

External links
John Lodge official site
[ Allmusic]

1945 births
People from Erdington
Living people
English bass guitarists
English male guitarists
Male bass guitarists
English rock bass guitarists
Progressive rock bass guitarists
English cellists
English male singer-songwriters
The Moody Blues members
English record producers
Alumni of Aston University
English Christians
English tenors
Musicians from Birmingham, West Midlands
British rhythm and blues boom musicians
Ivor Novello Award winners
Decca Records artists
English rock guitarists